The 2019–20 FIS Ski Jumping World Cup was the 41st World Cup season in ski jumping for men, the 23rd official World Cup season in ski flying, and the 9th World Cup season for women. Before the season started, the FIS changed the name from Ladies to Women's World Cup.

Map of world cup hosts 
All 26 locations hosting world cup events for men (21), for women (13) and shared (8) in this season.

 Raw Air
 Titisee-Neustadt Five
 Willingen Five
 Four Hills Tournament
 Russia Tour Blue Bird

Calendar

Men 
World Cup history in real time

including LH event in Lillehammer (10 March 2020)

Women 
World Cup history in real time

including LH event in Lillehammer (10 March 2020)

Men's team 
World Cup history in real time

including LH event in Oslo (7 March 2020)

Women's team 
World Cup history in real time

including NH event in Zaō (18 January 2020)

Men's standings

Overall

Nations Cup

Prize money

Four Hills Tournament

Titisee Neustadt Five

Willingen Five

Raw Air

Ski Flying

Women's standings

Overall

Nations Cup

Prize money

Raw Air

Qualifications

Men

Women

Achievements 
First World Cup career victory

Men
 Yukiya Satō (24), in his third season – the WC 3 in Nizhny Tagil
 Marius Lindvik (21), in his fourth season – the WC 9 in Garmisch-Partenkirchen
 Stephan Leyhe (28), in his eighth season – the WC 19 in Willingen

Women
 Chiara Hölzl (22), in her eighth  season – the WC 3 in Klingenthal
 Marita Kramer (18), in her third season – the WC 4 in Sapporo
 Eva Pinkelnig (31), in her sixth season – the WC 5 in Sapporo

First World Cup podium

Men
 Anže Lanišek (23), in his seventh season – the WC 1 in Wisła
 Philipp Aschenwald (24), in his fifth season – the WC 2 in Ruka
 Killian Peier (24), in his seventh season – the WC 4 in Nizhny Tagil
 Marius Lindvik (21), in his fourth season – the WC 5 in Klingenthal
 Jan Hörl (21), in his second season – the WC 7 in Engelberg
 Constantin Schmid (20), in his fourth season – the WC 23 in Râșnov
 Žiga Jelar (22), in his fourth season – the WC 27 in Lillehammer

Women
 Marita Kramer (18), in her third season – the WC 4 in Sapporo
 Lara Malsiner (19), in her fifth season – the WC 13 in Hinzenbach
 Silje Opseth (20), in her fifth season – the WC 15 in Lillehammer

Number of wins this season (in brackets are all-time wins)

Men
 Stefan Kraft – 5 (21)
 Karl Geiger – 4 (6)
 Kamil Stoch – 3 (36)
 Ryōyū Kobayashi – 3 (16)
 Dawid Kubacki – 3 (4)
 Daniel-André Tande – 2 (7)
 Marius Lindvik – 2 (2)
 Yukiya Satō – 2 (2)
 Peter Prevc – 1 (23)
 Piotr Żyła – 1 (2)
 Stephan Leyhe – 1 (1)

Women
 Chiara Hölzl – 6 (6)
 Maren Lundby – 5 (30)
 Eva Pinkelnig – 3 (3)
 Sara Takanashi – 1 (57)
 Marita Kramer – 1 (1)

Footnotes

Retirements

Men
 Fredrik Bjerkeengen
 Federico Cecon 
 Thomas Hofer
 Jaka Hvala
 Kenshiro Ito
 Gabriel Karlen
 Martti Nõmme
 Jurij Tepeš
 Elias Tollinger
 Tomáš Vančura

Women
 Elena Runggaldier

References

External links

FIS Ski Jumping World Cup
World cup
World cup
Ski jumping